Ianis Ilie Stoica (born 8 December 2002) is a Romanian professional footballer who plays as a forward or an attacking midfielder for Liga I club Universitatea Cluj, on loan from FCSB.

Club career

Early career
Stoica started his career in 2009 in the academy of Petrolul Ploiești, the same year his father Pompiliu signed a professional contract with the club. He left Petrolul in 2016 when it folded, and then had a six-month spell with SC Freiburg in Germany before returning to his country with FCSB, also a former club of his father.

FCSB
Stoica made his senior debut for FCSB on 25 October 2017, aged 14, in a 6–1 away rout of Sănătatea Cluj in the Cupa României. He became the youngest player to feature in a competitive match for the club, and also scored his first goal in the process. In the winter transfer window of 2019, Stoica agreed to a loan with Dunărea Călărași for the remainder of the season, and on 17 February made his Liga I debut in a goalless draw with Voluntari.

Stoica spent the following campaigns on loan in the second tier with former youth team Petrolul Ploiești, Metaloglobus București and CSM Slatina, respectively. He had his most fruitful stint with the latter, managing to score seven times from 24 games in spite of the club's relegation at the end of the 2020–21 season.

On 1 August 2021, upon his return to FCSB, Stoica came off the bench to equalise late in a 1–1 league draw at UTA Arad. On the 29th that month, he scored the only goal of the Roș-albaștrii in a 1–4 away loss to four-time defending champions CFR Cluj. Following his breakthrough in the senior team, owner George Becali announced that he rejected a €7.5 million bid for Stoica from Premier League club Arsenal, although the veridicity of his claims was questioned.

On 15 December 2021, Stoica came off the bench at half-time, obtained a penalty in extra time and netted a goal for himself for a 3–1 derby defeat of Rapid București. On 30 January 2022, he scored again in a Bucharest derby by coming off the bench in a 3–0 win over Dinamo București.

After failing to score any goal during the first half of the 2022–23 season, Stoica was sent out on a six-month loan to Universitatea Cluj on 17 December 2022.

International career
Stoica is a Romania youth international, and has represented the country at under-16, under-17, under-18, under-19 and under-21 levels. On 15 August 2019, Stoica scored on debut for the under-18s in a 4–1 victory against Albania. He repeated the performance at the under-21 side on 7 September 2021, netting in a 1–1 friendly draw with Georgia.

Style of play
Stoica is a versatile attacker, being able to play on the wing or as a lone striker, but can also be deployed in a less advanced position in the midfield. Michael Yokhin of Goal noted that he "is quick, loves to dribble and improvise, and feels comfortable on both flanks", although "he would arguably be more dangerous on the left" since he is right-footed.

Personal life
Stoica's father, Pompiliu, was also a professional footballer. A left-back, he too played for FCSB—then named Steaua București—and Petrolul Ploiești.

Career statistics

Club

References

External links

FCSB official profile 

2002 births
Living people
Footballers from Bucharest
Romanian footballers
Association football forwards
Liga I players
Liga II players
FC Steaua București players
FC Dunărea Călărași players
FC Petrolul Ploiești players
FC Metaloglobus București players
CSM Slatina footballers
FC Universitatea Cluj players
Romania youth international footballers
Romania under-21 international footballers
Romanian expatriate footballers
Expatriate footballers in Germany
Romanian expatriate sportspeople in Germany